Snack Attack is a maze action video game developed by Dan Illowsky for the Apple II family of computers. It was published by Datamost in 1981.

Gameplay
The player controls the Snacker, a small, white, fish-like character, and moves through a maze to "eat" all the gumdrops scattered throughout. Meanwhile, the Gumdrop Guards, four enemies that patrol the maze, attempt to catch the Snacker. Green and purple barriers can only be crossed by the Snacker and the Guards, respectively.

To control the character, J, K, W, and S keys are used to move the character in various directions, allowing the player to escape the aforementioned Gumdrop Guards. 

By eating one of several "magic stars" in the maze, the Snacker gains a set of sharp teeth and can briefly eat the guards for bonus points, sending them back to their home base to regenerate. At times, a giant jack-o-lantern appears and can be eaten for bonus points. Once all the gumdrops have been cleared, the player begins the next maze at a faster speed. The game cycles through three different mazes. The game cannot be paused; however, one of the three mazes contains a small area where the Guards cannot enter; the player can leave the Snacker there indefinitely.

Reception
The game debuted in October 1981, and sold 25,000 copies by June 1982, tied for fourth on Computer Gaming Worlds list of top sellers. Snack Attack won an award in the category of "Best Solitaire Computer Game" at the 4th annual Arkie Awards, where judges praised its "multiple mazes, charming graphics and sound effects, and well-nigh-addictive play action". The game's colour-coded doors were also described as "another big plus, adding an extra dollop of strategy". David H. Ahl of Creative Computing Video & Arcade Games said of Snack Attack and Jawbreaker, that "for PacMan fans, either is recommended."

Legacy
The sequel, Snack Attack II, is an IBM PC compatible-only game co-authored with Michael Abrash and published by Funtastic.

References

1982 video games
Apple II games
Apple II-only games
Datamost games
Maze games
North America-exclusive video games
Pac-Man clones
Video games about food and drink
Video games developed in the United States
Single-player video games
Funtastic games